David John Abbott (11 October 1938 – 17 May 2014) was a British advertising executive who founded Abbott Mead Vickers BBDO. He was one of the most celebrated advertising executives in the world and regarded as the greatest copywriter of his generation. Highlights of his career include the creation of the J.R. Hartley television commercial for Yellow Pages as well as work for Volkswagen, Volvo, The Economist, The RSPCA, Sainsbury's Supermarkets and Chivas Regal.

Career History
Born in Hammersmith, west London, David Abbott won a scholarship to read History at Merton College, Oxford but left before graduating to nurse his sick father who was ill with cancer and who later died. Abbott started as a copywriter working in-house at Kodak after discovering a book at a market stall about advertising on Madison Avenue. In 1963 he then moved to the Mather & Crowther agency before moving to the Manhattan-based Doyle Dane Bernbach 1965.

At Doyle Dane Bernbach, Abbott was taken under the wing of Bill Bernbach, the visionary creative director of DDB. In 1971 he returned to the UK and founded French Gold Abbott. Then in 1977 Abbott co-founded Abbott Mead Vickers BBDO alongside Adrian Vickers and Peter Mead in 1977, having first met Vickers at Oxford University in 1959. The agency's clients included Volvo, Sainsbury's, IKEA, Chivas Regal, The Economist, Yellow Pages,  and the RSPCA. In 1991, BBDO acquired a stake in AMV and appended their name.

Abbott retired from advertising in October 1998 at the age of 60 to concentrate on writing his first novel.

Awards and accolades
David Abbott was D&AD President in 1975 and President's Award Winner in 1986.

The One Club for Art and Copy inducted Abbott into its Creative Hall of Fame in 2001 three years after he retired. Abbott was the second Briton, after David Ogilvy, to be inducted into the hall of fame.

FCUK controversy
In 2000 David Abbott wrote an open letter to Campaign Magazine in response to the publication awarding FCUK their advertiser of the year accolade. The letter to the publication read:

Fcuk me, what a brilliant choice for advertiser of the year. Fcuking great idea to put fcuking four-letter words on fcuking big posters, where every fcuking eight-year-old can see them. What a fcuking cool way to get up the noses of those fcuking parents and teacher tossers who are trying to bring their kids up as fcuking goody-goodies. That’s the way to sell a youth brand, though haven’t I seen it fcuking before on the lav walls? Anyhow, great to see the industry magazine behaving in such a fcuking great way - makes me fcuking nostalgic, it does.

In response to this letter Trevor Beattie, the man behind the campaign, hit back at Abbott during the Cannes Lions International Festival of Creativity accusing him of boring the pants off the audience with a lengthy diatribe.

Published works
Together with Alfredo Marcantonio and John O'Driscoll, David Abbott authored a book about the history of Volkswagen advertising entitled 'Remember those great Volkswagen ads?', which is comprehensive account of the most influential campaign in the history of advertising. His first novel, The Upright Piano Player, was published in 2010 by MacLehose Press. John Burnham Schwartz the author of Bicycle Days and Reservation Road called Abbott's debut novel 'a wise and moving debut, an accomplished novel of quiet depths and resonant shadows.'

The Upright Piano Player

In 1998, he announced his retirement from the agency he founded in order to take up a new career as an author. Of course, other advertising copywriters before him had successfully taken the plunge. Though it is fair to say that none of them had received the kind of industry recognition that Abbott had. There had been Fay Wheldon ( ‘Go to work on an egg’). There had been Peter Mayle (‘Nice one Cyril’ for Wonderloaf bread). And there had been Salman Rushdie (who readily admits to penning ‘naughty but nice’ for fresh cream cakes).

Admittedly, it took some while to complete his first work of fiction, but in 2010 Abbott's debut novel ‘The Upright Piano Player’ finally hit the shelves. It was clearly a labour of love as every line has been so carefully considered and honed. Lines like this: 'Designer gowns from a former era, lovingly preserved in polythene, hang uneasily on bodies that have had no such luck.' The book is peppered with such lines, yet the narrative is brisk and not the least bit laboured. And, of course, there's that sharp perceptiveness about human nature and the little observations that lift the writing to another level. We also get a real feeling for the characters themselves through Abbott's ear for dialogue.

The story itself is an incredibly sad one and is structured like a Kurt Vonnegut novel starting at the end. But in all other respects, it is as far apart from a Vonnegut novel as you could possibly get. Many reviewers have compared the writing to Ian McEwan, and it's a fair comparison.

The story's protagonist, one Henry Cage is a perfectly affable character on the surface. He has enjoyed a successful career as the founder of his own management consultancy business. But on retirement, it becomes clear that Cage's personal life is anything but perfect. As the novel progresses, Abbott allows us to peek into Cage's family dynamics and the fracturing of relationships, which could so easily have been averted. Added into the mix are a string of random incidents that have truly devastating consequences and are well beyond Cage's control, although he has (without wanting or knowing) by his own actions an influence on the events. Together the sequence of events makes for a tragedy of epic proportions and demonstrates the fragility of life. But don't be put off. The narrative is compelling, and you really do want to spend time in Henry Cage's company. He is sharp, witty and likeable, if a bit obstinate and set in his ways. The closing line to the novel is utterly heartbreaking, as we know from the very first page how this story ends. And that's another aspect of the novel that marks it out. We know from page one how it ends but we don't quite know how it gets there. But when we do finally get there and everything has been unravelled, the emotional punch of the very last page is enormous and gut-wrenching because we know that the last page isn't actually the last page.

Personal life

Abbott was married with four children and eight grandchildren.

Death
David Abbott died at the age of 75 after undergoing heart surgery at London's Royal Brompton Hospital. He was buried on the eastern side of Highgate Cemetery.

References

External links
David Abbott profile via The One Club
David Abbott last interview website http://www.davidabbottsaid.com

1938 births
2014 deaths
Burials at Highgate Cemetery
British copywriters
Alumni of Merton College, Oxford